Lylian Lebreton (born 6 January 1972) is a former French cyclist.

Career achievements

Major results

1992
1st Trois jours de Cherbourg
1994
1st Tour de l'Ain
1st stage 1
3rd Tour du Limousin
1995
3rd Tour du Vaucluse
1997
1st stage 11 Vuelta Ciclista de Chile
3rd Polymultipliée Lyonnaise
3rd Tour de l'Avenir
2001
2nd Mi-Août Bretonne

Grand Tour general classification results timeline

References

1972 births
Living people
French male cyclists
Cyclists from Nantes